Newhaven Marine railway station was a station in Newhaven, East Sussex, England, at the end off a short branch off the Seaford branch line near . It was the last station to open in Newhaven in 1886 following redevelopment and expansion of the Port of Newhaven and served cross-Channel boat trains to Dieppe, France.

The station went into decline after the ferry terminal was moved away from it in 1984, and boat train services declined generally after the Channel Tunnel opened in 1994. It was closed to passengers in 2006 on safety grounds, but remained legally open, serving inaccessible parliamentary trains until it was formally closed in 2020. The branch remains open for freight traffic.

Location
The station was adjacent to the Port of Newhaven at the edge of a branch line south of Newhaven Harbour station, where the main line continues to Seaford.

The single platform of Newhaven Marine was numbered 3, which dates from when it was considered part of Newhaven Harbour station (which used platforms 1 and 2).

History

It was a terminal station until 1864, when the line was extended to Seaford.

On 17 May 1886, the London, Brighton and South Coast Railway opened a station further south that was built on reclaimed land south of Mill Creek, and provided a more direct access to boat train services that did not have to depend on tide times. The earlier station was renamed Newhaven Harbour and the new station called Newhaven Harbour (Boat Station). The line was electrified by the Southern Railway, with work completed on 16 July 1947, with regular electric boat train services from London Victoria beginning on 15 May 1949.

Newhaven Marine offered regular services from Victoria with connections for ferry passengers travelling to Dieppe in France. The ferry terminal was relocated further north in the 1980s closer to Newhaven Town, removing Newhaven Marine's principal importance, and services to the station were progressively reduced. The last boat train to run from this station was on 14 May 1984, a British Rail SR V class 4-4-0 steam service. On the same date, the station was renamed Newhaven Marine. Demand for the station was further reduced by the opening of the Channel Tunnel in 1994 leading to a general fall in demand of boat train services.

Parliamentary service
In August 2006, the station was closed to the public due to safety concerns over the condition of the roof canopy, which was later removed. Trains continued to run along the line with a single evening service, stopping at the station platform and reversing back to Newhaven Harbour, but with passengers unable to access the train.

Attention was brought to the situation in a BBC Radio 4 programme, The Ghost Trains of Old England in October 2010, and the station became well known among railway enthusiasts for its unusual status. The station was interesting because of parliamentary train services to the station that appeared in timetables but were inaccessible to the public, and which nonetheless called at the station once a day in order to fulfil the legal obligations of an 'open' station. A poster at the station offered ticket-holders a taxi to Newhaven Harbour station at the scheduled time of the parliamentary train, although the journey between the two stations was a short walk. In May 2017, the station buildings were demolished and access to the site remained impossible. Service was suspended in early 2019 due to resignalling works.

Closure

In May 2018, it was announced that the station was being considered for a legal closure as part of plans to improve freight connectivity in the area. On 15 January 2020, the Department for Transport (DfT) opened a formal public consultation to close the station, citing this reason. It further stated the work required to rebuild and repair the station to modern standards, including closed-circuit television, information points and toilets, would cost over £600,000 and provide no perceivable benefit for the community. As the station site was only accessible via Newhaven Harbour station and the route between the two passed no residential properties, Network Rail suggested reopening it would provide no travel improvements for anyone. A saving of an estimated £1.9 million was quoted. The closure was advertised on posters and digital signs at Victoria.

The consultation ended on 19 April. It attracted 27 responses with only 4 opposing the decision to close the station. Two of these opposed the closure on the basis that it may negatively impact local rail services; the other two raised concerns over the closure of any railway station on environmental grounds. With very little opposition to closure, the DfT announced their proposal to do so on 24 June. The DfT's decision was submitted to the Office of Rail and Road for ratification, and after approving the DfT's decision, the station was formally closed on 22 October. Former parliamentary under-secretary of state for the DfT and local member of parliament for Lewes, Norman Baker, said the 14-year delay to formally close the station was "a joke", sarcastically suggesting that Network Rail could re-open it as "Newhaven Rubble".

Following closure, the site of Newhaven Marine was redeveloped to accommodate a siding and turnback for passenger trains, as well as the reception siding for a new freight facility. Further south, the track extends into Newhaven East Quay, to a marine-dredged aggregates handling plant. Aggregates and sand imported from ships are carried by conveyor and loaded onto freight trains towards London. The first aggregates train was operated by DB Cargo UK and ran on 18 June 2020.

See also
 Closure by stealth
 Folkestone Harbour railway station

References
Notes

Citations

Sources

External links
 Newhaven Marine Ghost Train – Geoff Marshall and Vicki Pipe
 Government plans to close Newhaven Marine rail station – IanVisits
 Seaside Postcard – Newhaven – Diamond Geezer

Disused railway stations in East Sussex
Former London, Brighton and South Coast Railway stations
Railway stations in Great Britain opened in 1886
Railway stations in Great Britain closed in 2006
Railway stations serving harbours and ports in the United Kingdom
Newhaven, East Sussex